Michael W. Brubaker (born 1958) is an American politician and member of the Republican. He served in the Pennsylvania State Senate, representing the 36th District from 2007 until his retirement in 2015. Brubaker is a member of the Ephrata Area Chamber of Commerce, National Rifle Association, Millcreek Sportsmen Club, Cooper Hill Sportsmen Club, Farm Foundation and Bennett Round Table, Lancaster Evangelical Church, Millport Conservancy, Penn-Ag Industries, Pennsylvania Energy Advisory Board, Pennsylvania Farm Bureau, and Pennsylvania Grange; numerous awards, including National Conservation Tillage Consultant of the Year 1990, Jaycees Outstanding Young Community Leader 1991, National Communicator of the Year 1991, U.S. EPA National Administrators Award 1991, Agricultural Consultant of the Year 1994, Future Farmers of America Award 1997, Crop Professionals Hall of Fame Recipient 1998; Who's Who Leading American Executives 1992 and Who's Who in the East 1995; Member of Senate 2007 to date.

Electoral history

References

External links
State Senator Mike Brubaker official PA Senate website
Brubaker for Senator official campaign website

Pennsylvania state senators
Living people
1958 births